Mackenziellidae is a family of springtails belonging to the order Symphypleona.

Genera 
Mackenziellidae includes the following genera:

 Mackenziella Hammer, 1953

References 

Collembola
Arthropod families